The Bethesda Meeting House (BMH) is a historic Presbyterian church complex located at Bethesda, Montgomery County, Maryland, USA. Its name became the namesake of the entire surrounding community in the 1870s. It is situated on Maryland Route 355 (known as Rockville Pike at this point) just inside the Capital Beltway.

Description
The BMH property includes the 1850 meeting house itself, the mid-late 19th century parsonage to the south, and the associated cemetery. The church is a large, wood-frame structure built in the Greek Revival "temple" form, although it features Gothic-style windows throughout.  To the south of the church is a two-story frame Victorian parsonage built on a cruciform plan, with some Queen Anne-style embellishments.

History
The church was constructed on the foundation of an 1820 Presbyterian church which burned down in 1849. It served as the Bethesda Presbyterian Church from 1850 until 1925 when the congregation decided to erect a new church on Wilson Lane, farther south in Bethesda. The Presbyterian congregation, however, retained ownership of the cemetery.

Mrs. Kelley lived in the church building for many years. In 1945, the property was sold to a French Algerian Catholic missionary group called the Missionaries of Africa, commonly known as the White Fathers. In the 1950s, the property was transferred again, this time to the trustees of the Temple Hill Baptist Church.

Legacy
 The community of Bethesda was named in 1871 by the postmaster, Robert Franck, after the BMH. After nearly 10 years of lobbying efforts, Rev. Edward Henry Cumpston (pastor of BMH) convinced Mr. Franck to change the name of the post office from "Darcy's Store" to "Bethesda" in 1871.
 The BMH was listed on the National Register of Historic Places in 1977.

References

Citations

Other sources
 The Spirit of Captain John, by Eugene and Edythe Clark, Carlton Press, New York, NY, 1970
 Old Bethesda by Dorce Germaine Holman and Not So Old, by Gertrude D. Bradley, Franklin Press, Gaithersburg, MD, 1956
 Bethesda: A Social History, by William M Offutt, The Innovation Game, Bethesda, MD, 1995

External links
, including photo in 1974, at Maryland Historical Trust website
Bethesda Meeting House, history of Bethesda Meeting House at allBethesda.com
Bethesda Presbyterian Church

Churches on the National Register of Historic Places in Maryland
Churches completed in 1850
Greek Revival church buildings in Maryland
Queen Anne architecture in Maryland
Buildings and structures in Bethesda, Maryland
Churches in Montgomery County, Maryland
Presbyterian churches in Maryland
National Register of Historic Places in Montgomery County, Maryland